Apatitic scale microfossils are a group of reticulate phosphatic plates found in the Neoproterozoic strata of the Fifteenmile Group, Yukon, Canada.  They represent some of the earliest examples of biologically induced biomineralization, using the mineral hydroxyapatite.

References

Microfossils
Neoproterozoic Canada